Malawi sent a delegation of four representatives to compete at the 2008 Summer Olympics in Beijing, People's Republic of China.

Athletics

Men

Women

Key
Note–Ranks given for track events are within the athlete's heat only
Q = Qualified for the next round
q = Qualified for the next round as a fastest loser or, in field events, by position without achieving the qualifying target
NR = National record
N/A = Round not applicable for the event
Bye = Athlete not required to compete in round

Swimming

Men

Women

References

Nations at the 2008 Summer Olympics
2008
Olympics